Events from the year 1937 in France.

Incumbents
President: Albert Lebrun 
President of the Council of Ministers: Léon Blum (until 22 June), Camille Chautemps (starting 22 June)

Events
1 May – General strike in Paris.
21 June – Coalition government of Léon Blum resigns.

Sport
30 June – Tour de France begins.
25 July – Tour de France ends, won by Roger Lapébie.

Births

21 January – François Boutin, Thoroughbred horse trainer (died 1995)
8 February – Françoise Claustre, archaeologist (died 2006)
13 February – Andrée Brunin, poet (died 1993)
4 March – Barney Wilen, saxophonist and jazz composer (died 1996)
21 March – François Bonlieu, Alpine skier and Olympic gold medallist (died 1973)
12 May – Dominique Chaboche, politician and MEP (died 2005)
24 May – Maryvonne Dupureur, Olympic athlete (died 2008)
12 July – Lionel Jospin, Prime Minister of France
22 July 
 Jean-Claude Lebaube, road racing cyclist (died 1977)
 Gilberte Marin-Moskovitz, politician (died 2019)
26 August – Nina Companeez, screenwriter and film director (died 2015)
15 September – Jean-Claude Decaux, advertising executive (died 2016)
31 October – Jean-Louis Servan-Schreiber, journalist (died 2020)
14 November – Marion Créhange, computer scientist (died 2022)

Deaths
31 January – Marguerite Audoux, novelist (born 1863)
12 March – Charles-Marie Widor, organist and composer (born 1844)
18 March – Mélanie Bonis, composer (born 1858)
10 May – Paul Émile Chabas, painter (born 1869)
2 June – Louis Vierne, organist and composer (born 1870)
16 October – Jean de Brunhoff, writer and illustrator (born 1899)
28 December – Maurice Ravel, composer and pianist (born 1875)

See also
 List of French films of 1937

References

1930s in France